Joseph Heintz may refer to:
Joseph Heintz the Elder (1564–1609), Swiss painter, draftsman and architect
Joseph Heintz the Younger (1600–1678), German painter